The 1996 Division One Championship season was the second tier of British rugby league during the 1996 season, and was also the first season of rugby league to be played in the summer. The competition featured all eleven teams from the 1995–96 Rugby Football League season.

Championship
The league was won by Salford Reds for a second successive season, winning promotion to the Super League. The club also won the Divisional Premiership final against Keighley Cougars, with Cliff Eccles winning the Tom Bergin Trophy.

Rochdale Hornets and Batley Bulldogs were both relegated to Division Two.

League table

Premiership

Statistics
The following are the top points scorers in Division One during the 1996 season. Statistics are for league matches only.

Most tries

Most goals

Most points

See also
Super League war
1996 Challenge Cup

References

External links

1996 season at wigan.rlfans.com

Rugby Football League Championship
RFL Division One